Informit may refer to:

InformIT, a subsidiary of British publisher Pearson Education in the US
Informit (Australia), a subsidiary of RMIT University in Melbourne, Australia, and the owner of Informit (database)
Informit (database), an online resource owned and managed by the RMIT Informit